is a private junior college in Mizunami, Gifu, Japan.

History 
The college was founded in 1966.

Courses offered 
 Child care
 Food
 Nutrition

See also 
 Chukyo University
 List of junior colleges in Japan

References

External links 
  

Educational institutions established in 1966
Japanese junior colleges
1966 establishments in Japan
Universities and colleges in Gifu Prefecture
Private universities and colleges in Japan